Jeremy Robert Myron Sumpter (born February 5, 1989) is an American actor. His prominent roles include the title role in the 2003 live action film Peter Pan, Jacob in the 2014 disaster film Into the Storm, and the recurring role of J. D. McCoy in the NBC television series Friday Night Lights (2008–2010).

Early life
Sumpter was born in Carmel-by-the-Sea, California, to Sandy (née Johnson) and Gary Sumpter. He has a twin sister, Jessica, and two other siblings, Travis and Jennifer. His family moved to his mother's hometown, Mount Sterling, Kentucky, when he was ten months old.

Career
When Sumpter was 11, he entered International Modeling and Talent Association and started his modeling in Kentucky. He also won Pre-Teen Male Model of the Year, where he signed with Mark Robert as his personal manager. Sumpter then decided to move to Los Angeles, California with his family and start acting afterwards.

Sumpter's first movie role was in the 2001 film Frailty as the young Adam Mieks seen in flashbacks. Sumpter received a Saturn Award nomination for "Best Performance by a Younger Actor" for his performance.  Following that, he appeared with Danny Glover in the Showtime film Just a Dream, for which he received a Young Artist Award for "Best Performance in a TV Movie, Mini-Series or Special - Leading Young Actor".  His next film was Local Boys, a family surfing drama, with Mark Harmon and Eric Christian Olsen.

In July 2002, at age 13, Sumpter was selected for the role of Peter Pan. Sumpter did nearly all of his stunts for the film himself. To prepare, he says he practiced sword fighting as much as five hours a day, as well as training in gymnastics and lifting weights. While filming in Australia, he supplemented his training with cricket and surfing. Sumpter grew several inches while in the film's production, requiring staging tricks to retain Captain Hook's height advantage over Peter in face-to-face scenes late in the process. Producer Lucy Fisher also said that, "The window he flies out of had to be enlarged twice." Despite the film's box office failure, Sumpter has won both a Saturn and Young Artist Award for the film.

In the fall of 2004, he starred in the TV series Clubhouse as a boy who gets his dream job of working as a batboy for a New York City major league baseball team.  The series was canceled by CBS after five episodes; all 11 episodes made have since been broadcast on cable/satellite channels.  He then starred in Cyber Seduction: His Secret Life, a Lifetime Channel movie about a popular teenager whose life is ruined by an addiction to internet pornography.

Sumpter spent the summer of 2005 in Oregon filming the teen comedy The Sasquatch Gang (a.k.a. The Sasquatch Dumpling Gang), released in November 2006. He had a small role in the film An American Crime, which played on Showtime in 2008 before going to DVD. He appeared in an episode of CSI: Miami as the boyfriend of a girl whose parents are murdered.

He completed filming roles in the coming-of-age comedy Calvin Marshall, Soul Surfer and Death and Cremation. He appeared in the meteorological disaster film Into the Storm as Jacob Hodges, a young cameraman for the stormchasers.

Personal life
During filming for Peter Pan, Sumpter briefly became romantically involved with co-star Rachel Hurd-Wood. In December 2015, Sumpter announced that he and Lauren Pacheco were engaged to be married, but in October 2016 stated that they were no longer engaged. On October 1, 2022, Sumpter married Elizabeth Treadway in a ceremony in Columbia, Tennessee. Sumpter announced on December 25, 2022, via Instagram that he and Treadway are expecting a baby girl whom they plan on naming Lucy Snow Sumpter.

Filmography

Awards

References

External links

 Official website
 

1989 births
American male child actors
American male film actors
Male models from California
American male television actors
21st-century American male actors
Male actors from Kentucky
Male actors from California
American twins
People from Carmel-by-the-Sea, California
People from Mount Sterling, Kentucky
Living people